Best Of is a greatest hits compilation album by American progressive metal band Between the Buried and Me. The three-disc CD/DVD set was released by Victory Records on March 29, 2011. Best Of was also released shortly after the announcement of Between the Buried and Me's signing to Metal Blade Records. The album's packaging features several hidden images that can be revealed by using a decoder.

Jason Lymangrover of Allmusic gave the album three and a half out of five stars, and stated, "Boasting two discs and a bonus DVD with four music videos, as well as some slick packaging, it's a nice collector's item for fans, and a good jumping-off point for people looking to get their feet wet with one of the most versatile prog-metalcore groups in the business." However, Lymangrover also said, "it's not quite the full experience because BTBAM's impressive first self-titled album is not included, and the band's albums often play conceptually from front to end, but these are minor complaints."

Track listing

References

2011 greatest hits albums
Between the Buried and Me albums
Victory Records compilation albums
Albums produced by Jamie King (record producer)